Minicucci is a surname. Notable people with the surname include:
Ben Minicucci (born 1967), Canadian-born American airline executive
Christina Minicucci, American politician
Dominick Minicucci Jr. (born 1969), American gymnast
Manél Minicucci (born 1995), Italian footballer
Matthew Minicucci (born 1981), American writer and poet